Björn Bürger (born 10 October 1985) is a German operatic baritone.

Life 
Born in Darmstadt, Bürger, son of two teachers and five years younger than his brother the actor and theater director Lars Bürger, spent his childhood and youth in Rodgau near Frankfurt am Main.

School and university years 
Bürger obtained there the Abitur in 2005 and began first a study in the faculty of spoken theatre at the Hochschule für Musik und Darstellende Kunst Frankfurt am Main. In 2007 he moved there to the department of opera singing.

Musical development 
Bürger, encouraged by his parents, received early piano lessons at the local free music school and taught himself how to play the guitar. His piano teacher Benjamin Schütze drew his attention to Rio Reiser, and Bürger began to interpret his music playfully and vocally. In addition to his piano training, he also took singing lessons with Gottfried Kärner, the leader of the Polyhymnia pop choir in his hometown, in which Bürger also sang.

Still in his school days, Bürger was a singer of the band Up To Now, and later an active member of the South Hessian artist group Pro-these and the theatre group MomentMal. In 2000 he performed the musical Herr Fresssack und die Bremer Stadtmusikanten at the musical project of the music school Bad Nauheim, which is based on the radio play of the same name with Ton Steine Scherben from 1973. Numerous solo performances as Rio-Reiser interpreter followed. In 2003 Bürger received the cultural award of his hometown "for his artistic work in the fields of singing, theatre and piano" in 2002.

From 2007 to 2013 Bürger studied opera singing at the Hochschule für Musik und Darstellende Kunst Frankfurt am Main in the class of Hedwig Fassbender. During his studies he had four engagements in productions of the Oper Frankfurt besides further solo appearances as Rio-Reiser interpreter and guest roles as opera singer. He also took part in various annual productions at his university, such as the Höchster Opernsommer in the leading role of Osmin in Mozart's Singspiel Zaide and in the leading role of King Argante at the Handel Festival Karlsruhe.

In November 2012, at the age of 27, Bürger won the Bundeswettbewerb Gesang Berlin finals at the Komische Oper Berlin against eleven other young artists and won the first prize, endowed with 10,000 euros.

Three months later, together with the mezzo-soprano Dorottya Láng, Bürger received the Emmerich Smola prize, one of the highest endowed prizes for young singers. After a concert with the competition finalists in the Festhalle of Landau the audience decided on the awarding of the prizes, which were associated with a concert engagement with the Deutsche Radio Philharmonie Saarbrücken Kaiserslautern.

Since the 2013/14 season Bürger has belonged to the permanent ensemble of the Oper Frankfurt. In November 2017 he was able to achieve a great personal success in the title role of the world premiere of Arnulf Herrmann's Der Mieter. According to the Frankfurter Allgemeine he completed a vocal acting tour de force, which he mastered intensely, in many different ways most impressively.“

In 2016 he debuted at the Glyndebourne Festival Opera in Rossini's Il Barbiere di Siviglia in the lead role Figaro and the following year played “Harlekin” in Ariadne auf Naxos.

Scholarships, honours and prizes 
 2003 – Culture Award of the City of Rodgau.
 2011 – "MainCampus academicus-Stipendium" of the  Frankfurt am Main.
 2011 – Scholarship of the Da Ponte Foundation.
 2012 – First prize of the Bundeswettbewerb Gesang (Berlin).
 2013 – Emmerich Smola Award (Landau).

Performances and engagements 
 2000 – Bad Nauheim: Herr Fressack in Herr Fresssack und die Bremer Stadtmusikanten (musical) (Rio Reiser/R.P.S. Lanrue, 1973).
 2009 – Karlsruhe: König Argante in Handel's Rinaldo.
 2010 – Frankfurt-Höchst: Osmin in Mozart's Zaide.
 2010 – Rodgau: Soloist at the Rio–Reiser–Tribut–Konzert
 2011 – Bad Vilbel: Papageno in Mozart's Die Zauberflöte für Kinder.
 2010 – Bayreuth: Victor Hugo in Eine Kapitulation (opera, libretto by Wagner).
 2011 – Grand Théâtre de Genève: Drei Erscheinungen in Verdi's Macbeth.
 2012 – Oper Frankfurt: "Dr. Falke" in Johann Strauss' Die Fledermaus in the series "Opera for Children".
 2012 – Oper Frankfurt: Nicholas in Barber's Vanessa.
 2012 – Staatstheater Darmstadt: Lortzing's Die Opernprobe.
 2013 – Oper Frankfurt: Curio in Handel's Giulio Cesare in Egitto.
 2013 – Oper Frankfurt: Larkens in Puccini's La fanciulla del West.
 2013 – Concert engagement with the Deutsche Radio Philharmonie Saarbrücken-Kaiserslautern.

References

External links 
 

German operatic baritones
1985 births
Living people
Musicians from Darmstadt
21st-century German  male  opera singers